Mosetti is an Italian surname. Notable people with the surname include:

 Antonella Mosetti (born 1975), Italian showgirl, model and television presenter
 Paolo Mosetti (1939–2009), Italian Olympic rower

Italian-language surnames